The 2015 Finnish League Cup is the 19th season of the Finnish League Cup, Finland's second-most prestigious cup football tournament. SJK are the defending champions, having won their second league cup last year.

The cup consists of two stages. First there will be a group stage that involves the 12 Veikkausliiga teams divided into four groups. The top two teams from each group will enter the one-legged elimination rounds – quarter-finals, semi-finals and the final.

Group A

Group B

Group C

Group D

Knockout stage

Quarter-finals

Semi-finals

Final

Scorers
6 goals:

 Akseli Pelvas - SJK

5 goals:

 Vahid Hambo - Inter Turku

4 goals:

 Dever Orgill  - IFK Mariehamn
 Henry Chidozie  - Ilves

3 goals:

 Joni Korhonen - HIFK
 Erfan Zeneli - HJK
 Jonne Hjelm - Ilves
 Mika Ojala - Inter Turku
 Valeri Minkenen - KTP
 Aleksi Ristola - Lahti
 Adeniyi Michael Ibiyomi - RoPS
 Janne Saksela - RoPS

2 goals:

 Mike Havenaar - HJK
 Robin Lod - HJK
 Tomi Petrescu - Ilves
 Sergei Eremenko - Jaro
 Joona Veteli - Jaro
 Bahrudin Atajić - SJK
 Jussi Vasara - SJK
 Jordan Seabrook - VPS

1 goals:

 Jesse Ahonen - HIFK
 Nnaemeka Anyamele - HIFK
 Jani Bäckman - HIFK
 Jukka Halme - HIFK
 Fredrik Lassas - HIFK
 Tuomas Mustonen - HIFK
 Eero Peltonen - HIFK
 Youness Rahimi - HIFK
 Ville Salmikivi - HIFK
 Jukka Sinisalo - HIFK
 Tommi Vesala - HIFK
 Gideon Baah - HJK
 Ousman Jallow - HJK
 Omar Jama - HJK
 Lassi Järvenpää - HJK
 Atomu Tanaka - HJK
 Brian Span - IFK
 Mbachu Uchenna Emenike - Ilves
 Henri Lehtonen - Inter Turku
 Faith Friday Obilor - Inter Turku
 Robin Sid - Inter Turku
 Samuli Kaivonurmi - KTP
 Urho Nissilä - KuPS
 Ohi Omoijuanfo - KuPS
 Petteri Pennanen - KuPS
 Patrick Poutiainen - KuPS
 Irakli Sirbiladze - KuPS
 Charlie Trafford - KuPS
 Hassan Mila Sesay - Lahti
 Antti Okkonen - RoPS
 Vilim Posinković - RoPS
 Simo Roiha - RoPS
 Ariel Ngueukam - SJK
 Jesse Sarajärvi - SJK
 Cèdric Gogoua - SJK
 Marco Matrone - SJK
 Ville Koskimaa - VPS
 Tuomas Lähdesmäki - VPS

References

External links
Liigacup at Veikkausliiga site

Finnish League Cup